William Butler (December 17, 1759November 15, 1821) was a United States representative from South Carolina.

Life and career
Born in Prince William County in the Colony of Virginia, he moved to South Carolina as a young man. He served in the Snow Campaign under Colonel Richard Richardson in 1775 and in Gen. Andrew Williamson's expedition against the Cherokee Indians in 1776. In 1779 he was a lieutenant in Pulaski's Legion, under Gen. Benjamin Lincoln, and served under Gen. Andrew Pickens at the siege of Augusta in 1780. He served as captain under General William Henderson in 1781, and was a captain of Mounted Rangers under Pickens in 1782.

Butler was a member of the State convention which adopted the United States Constitution, and was a member of the South Carolina House of Representatives from 1787 to 1795. He was sheriff of the Ninety-Six District in 1791, and was elected major general of the upper division of State militia in 1796.

Butler was elected as a Democratic-Republican to the 7th United States Congress and served in the five succeeding Congresses, from March 4, 1801 to March 3, 1813. He then chose not to run for reelection.

Butler was a major general commanding the troops raised for the defense of South Carolina in the War of 1812, and then retired to his plantation, plantation on the Saluda River, near Mount Willing, South Carolina.

He died at his plantation in 1821 at the age of 61, and was buried in the Butler Family Cemetery at Butler Methodist Church, near Saluda.

William Butler was the father of William Butler (1790–1850), Andrew Pickens Butler, and Pierce Mason Butler, and the grandfather of Matthew Calbraith Butler. All except Pierce Butler (who served as governor of South Carolina) were members of the U.S. Congress from South Carolina. Butler was a first cousin to Sophia Butler (Smith) Bonham, the mother of Texas hero James Butler Bonham and U.S. Congressman Milledge Luke Bonham.

References

1759 births
1821 deaths
People from Prince William County, Virginia
American militia generals
South Carolina militiamen in the American Revolution
Members of the South Carolina House of Representatives
Butler-Belmont family
Democratic-Republican Party members of the United States House of Representatives from South Carolina